UHI Perth provides further education and higher education in the city of Perth, Scotland, through a main campus and by distance learning.

Courses include degrees, through its membership of the University of the Highlands and Islands, as well as work-based learning and vocational training. Degrees available include aircraft engineering, music, child and youth studies, social sciences and computing.

UHI Perth owns Air Service Training (AST), which has been delivering aeronautical engineering courses since 1934. AST is UK CAA approved and based at Perth Airport. Staff from organisations including British Airways, BMI, Malaysia Airlines, Aer Lingus, Kuwait Airways, Air Mauritius and Air Seychelles have been trained there.

Its English language school is a member of English UK and courses are approved by the British Council.

Research 
Research is conducted on a number of topics, and the College hosts the Centre for Mountain Studies (CMS), established in 2000. The Director of the CMS is Professor Martin Price, who has held the UNESCO Chair in Sustainable Mountain Development since 2009.  The CMS undertakes research at all scales from the globe to Scotland and has organised many conferences.  Since 2004, it has also run an online MSc in Sustainable Mountain Development.

History 
The College started in the old Academy building on Perth’s Rose Terrace in 1961 offering day-time further education (FE) courses in building trades, before expanding into a centre in Nelson Street (site of the Southern District School) soon afterwards.

Originally called Perth Technical College, the institution went on to be called Perth College of Further Education. After incorporation it was changed to Perth College. Due to its involvement in the University of the Highlands and Islands it is now UHI Perth. Gaining university status in 2011 has allowed the institution to award degrees for university courses.

The first part of its Crieff Road campus — the Brahan Building — was officially opened on 16 October 1971 by the then Secretary of State for Scotland, Gordon Campbell.

Built on the site of the Pullars’ (of dry-cleaning fame) family home, the College cost £1.25 million and had 24 full-time lecturers teaching 700 students.

Current structure 
Today UHI Perth employs around 500 full-time and part-time teaching and non-teaching staff and has around 9000 student enrolments.

Previously run by the local authority, it is now governed by a Board of Management made up of the Principal, staff representatives and volunteers from business, education and the wider community in and around Perth and Kinross.

Notable alumni
Graeme Pallister, chef

References

External links
UHI Perth website
UHI Perth Blog
UHI Perth on Facebook
UHI Perth on Twitter
University of the Highlands and Islands website
AST website

Education in Perth, Scotland
University of the Highlands and Islands
Buildings and structures in Perth, Scotland
Further education colleges in Scotland
Higher education colleges in Scotland
Educational institutions established in 1961
1961 establishments in Scotland